The 2013 French Super Series was a top level badminton competition which took place from October 22, 2013 to October 27, 2013 in Paris, France. It was the tenth BWF Super Series competition on the 2013 BWF Super Series schedule. The total purse for the event was $200,000. A qualification round was held for all five disciplines.

Men's singles

Seeds

 Lee Chong Wei
 Chen Long
 Kenichi Tago
 Jan Ø. Jørgensen
 Tommy Sugiarto
 Boonsak Ponsana
 Wang Zhengming
 Marc Zwiebler

Top half

Bottom half

Finals

Women's singles

Seeds

 Li Xuerui
 Ratchanok Intanon
 Juliane Schenk
 Saina Nehwal
 Wang Yihan
 Sung Ji-hyun
 Wang Shixian
 Tai Tzu-ying

Top half

Bottom half

Finals

Men's doubles

Seeds

 Mohammad Ahsan / Hendra Setiawan
 Mathias Boe / Carsten Mogensen
 Hiroyuki Endo / Kenichi Hayakawa
 Koo Kien Keat / Tan Boon Heong 
 Liu Xiaolong / Qiu Zihan
 Kim Gi-jung / Kim Sa-rang
 Ko Sung-hyun / Shin Baek-cheol
 Lee Yong-dae / Yoo Yeon-seong

Top half

Bottom half

Finals

Women's doubles

Seeds

 Wang Xiaoli / Yu Yang
 Christinna Pedersen / Kamilla Rytter Juhl
 Misaki Matsutomo / Ayaka Takahashi
 Jung Kyung-eun / Kim Ha-na
 Tian Qing / Zhao Yunlei
 Pia Zebadiah Bernadeth / Rizki Amelia Pradipta
 Ma Jin / Zhong Qianxin
 Duanganong Aroonkesorn / Kunchala Voravichitchaikul

Top half

Bottom half

Finals

Mixed doubles

Seeds

 Zhang Nan / Zhao Yunlei
 Xu Chen / Ma Jin
 Tontowi Ahmad / Liliyana Natsir
 Joachim Fischer Nielsen / Christinna Pedersen
 Chan Peng Soon / Goh Liu Ying
 Ko Sung-hyun / Kim Ha-na
 Sudket Prapakamol / Saralee Thungthongkam
 Markis Kido / Pia Zebadiah Bernadeth

Top half

Bottom half

Finals

References

French
2013 in French sport
French Open (badminton)
International sports competitions hosted by Paris